Deenbandhu Chhotu Ram Thermal Power Plant is located at Yamuna Nagar in Haryana. The power plant is one of the coal based power plants of HPGCL. It was jointly constructed by Reliance Energy Limited and Shanghai Electric (China) in a collaboration.

History

The project was first conceived in 1981-82 but it remained in suspended animation for more than two decades. The previous governments tried to implement the project, first through the private sector, then through the National Thermal Power Corporation, and thereafter attempts were also made to get it executed through foreign investments. But the project remained only on paper because governments were not serious about  setting up this project.
Former Indian prime minister, P V Narasimha Rao even laid the foundation stone of this project through remote control from Faridabad in March 1993.
At that time, the project was planned to be executed by NTPC, but that too could not go beyond construction of a few residential and non-residential buildings.
In year 2004 then chief minister of Haryana Om Prakash Chautala again laid the stone of this thermal plant but again the project remained on papers only. But in year 2005 the new chief minister of Haryana Bhupinder Singh Hooda gave nod to the project and the plant was finally developed in 2005-2008.

Power plant
Deenbandhu Chhotu Ram Thermal Power Station has an installed capacity of 600 MW. The First unit was commissioned in April 2008. This is the first project in the state to award to private developer.
The total available land of the project is 1107 acres. 
First unit was commissioned in a record period of 27 months which is the lowest for any coal based green field project in the country. The plant gets coal from Central coal fields.

Installed capacity

Future Expansions
HPGCL has announced the expansion of this plant. A 660 MW capacity additional super critical Thermal Unit at Yamuna Nagar will be constructed as an extension but approval nod is still awaited.

See also

References 

Coal-fired power stations in Haryana
Yamunanagar district
Energy infrastructure completed in 2007
2007 establishments in Haryana